Arunoday Banerjee, known as "Rahul", (born 16 October 1983), is an Indian Bengali actor. He has worked in films and TV. Banerjee made his stage appearance at the age of three with his father's (Biswanath Banerjee) theater troupe Bijoygarh Atmaprakash play entitled Raj Darshan. Since then, he has acted in almost 450 stage shows, with his father's troupe and with Theatron. He is married to co-actress Priyanka Sarkar. His first film, Chirodini Tumi Je Amar, directed by Raj Chakraborty, was a box-office success. He has subsequently appeared in films including Love Circus, Shono Mon Boli Tomay and Poti Poromesshor. His television debut was in the series Tumi Asbe Bole. He has received a number of awards such as Anandalok Award for the Best Actor for his role in Chirodini Tumi Je Amar.

Personal life 
He was born to a family of theatre artists. His father was a director of a theatre troupe named Bijoygor Atmaprakash. He attended Naktala High School and graduated from Ashutosh College. After having a long relationship with his co-actor Priyanka Sarkar, the couple got married. They have a son, Shohoj Banerjee.

Career 
Before coming into films and television Rahul did a number of theatre programmes. After doing it he opted for a career in television and got a breakthrough after appearing in a famous show on Zee Bangla titled Khela in the role of Aditya. After that, he got a film in offer which gave him widespread recognition.

Filmography

Web series

Television 
 Khela (2006–2008) as Aditya Barman, Zee Bangla
 Mohona (2008) as Arka, Zee Bangla
 Tumi Asbe Bole (2014–2016) as Rahul Debroy, Star Jalsha
 Swapno Udaan (2017) as Roopayan Sen, Star Jalsha
 Ardhangini (2018) as Umapati Bhattacharya, Star Jalsha
 Aye Khuku Aye (2019–2020) as Rahul, Sun Bangla
 Desher Maati (2021) as Dr.Rajrup Banerjee aka Raja, Star Jalsha
 Laalkuthi (2022) as Bikram Dastidar, Zee Bangla
 Horogouri Pice Hotel'' (2023) as Prabhakar Ghosh Star Jalsha

References

External links

1983 births
Living people
Male actors in Bengali cinema
Bengali male actors
Indian male film actors
People from Dhaka
Male actors from Kolkata
21st-century Indian male actors